Crosscurrents may refer to:

 CrossCurrents, a journal published by the University of North Carolina Press
 Crosscurrents (radio program), a newsmagazine from KALW-FM Public Radio in San Francisco
 Crosscurrents (Bill Evans album), 1977
 Crosscurrents (Lennie Tristano album), 1949 [1972]
 Cross Currents (Richard Souther album), 1989
 Cross Currents (1916 film), a 1916 American silent film
 Cross Currents (1935 film), a 1935 British comedy film
 Cross Currents (Eliane Elias album), 1987

See also
 Crosscurrent (disambiguation)